Grzegorz Bębnik (born 1970) is a Polish historian and an employee of the Institute of National Remembrance.

Reception and honors 
Jan Grabowski classified Ostatnia walka Afrykanerów (2004) as a fascist work that commended the "struggles" of the "white minority" in South Africa.

Selected publications
 
 
 Koniec pokoju, początek wojny. Niemieckie działania dywersyjne w kampanii polskiej 1939 r. Wybrane aspekty. 2014.

References

External links
 Short bio on IPN page

1970 births
21st-century Polish historians
Polish male non-fiction writers
Living people
People associated with the Institute of National Remembrance